Hilary Adair Marquand,  (24 December 1901 – 6 November 1972) was a British economist and Labour Party politician.

Life and career

He was born in Cardiff, the son of Alfred Marquand of Saint Peter Port, Guernsey, a clerk in a coal exporting company and his wife Mary née Adair, who was of Scottish ancestry. He was educated at Cardiff High School and at University College, Cardiff (State Scholar) where he studied history and economics, completing his undergraduate studies in 1924. He subsequently spent two years in the United States as a Rockefeller Foundation Fellow: upon his return to the UK he was a lecturer in Economics at the University of Birmingham from 1926–1930, and Professor of Industrial Relations, University College, Cardiff, 1930–1945. At the time of his appointment in Cardiff he was 29 years old, making him the youngest Professor at a British university at the time.

He was Director of Industrial Surveys of South Wales, 1931 and 1936, and Member of the Cardiff Advisory Committee Unemployment Assistance Board. He spent a year in the USA in the study of industrial relations, 1932–1933 and was Visiting Professor of Economics at Wisconsin University in 1938–1939. He was an Acting Principal at the Board of Trade, 1940–1941, and Deputy Controller, Wales Division, of the Ministry of Labour, 1941–1942 and Labour Adviser to the Ministry of Production, 1943–1944.

Although he was from a staunchly Conservative family, Marquand joined the Labour Party in 1920 and the Fabian Society in 1936. He was elected as Member of Parliament for Cardiff East from 1945–1950, where he defeated the then War Secretary James Grigg to take the seat, and for Middlesbrough East from 1950–1961. He was Secretary for Overseas Trade from 1945–1947; Paymaster-General, 1947–1948; Minister of Pensions, 1948–1951; and Minister of Health, January–October 1951. He was appointed a Privy Counsellor in 1949.

Following the defeat for Labour at the 1951 general election, Marquand was a prominent member of the Shadow Cabinet, serving as chief spokesman on pensions until 1959 and as chief spokesman on Commonwealth affairs under Hugh Gaitskell from 1959 to 1961.

He undertook lecture tours for the British Council in India, Pakistan and Ceylon, 1952–1953, in West Indies, 1954 and 1959 and in Finland, 1957, and was a representative at the Assemblies of the Council of Europe and Western European Union, 1957–1959. He was Deputy Chairman of the National Board for Prices and Incomes, 1965–1968. He was an Honorary Member of Phi Beta Kappa.

Increasingly unhappy with factional infighting within Labour, Marquand resigned his seat in Parliament in 1961, to take up the post of Director of the International Institute for Labour Studies, in Geneva.  The consequent by-election was won by the Labour candidate Arthur Bottomley. He served in Geneva until 1965.

Personal life

Hilary Marquand married Rachel Eluned Rees, a schoolteacher, on 20 August 1929. Their daughter Diana Marquand is an environmental campaigner and was a senior social worker. Their son David Marquand is also an academic and was a Labour MP from 1966 to 1977, while a younger son Richard Marquand became a notable Hollywood director.

Marquand died in 1972 at Hellingly Hospital, East Sussex, aged 70, and was buried at Cathays Cemetery, Cardiff.

References

External links 

 

1901 births
1972 deaths
Alumni of Cardiff University
Academics of the University of Birmingham
Welsh Labour Party MPs
Labour Party (UK) MPs for English constituencies
United Kingdom Paymasters General
Members of the Privy Council of the United Kingdom
UK MPs 1945–1950
UK MPs 1950–1951
UK MPs 1951–1955
UK MPs 1955–1959
UK MPs 1959–1964
Politicians from Cardiff
Welsh economists
People educated at Cardiff High School
Rockefeller Fellows
Members of the Fabian Society
Members of the Parliament of the United Kingdom for Cardiff constituencies
Ministers in the Attlee governments, 1945–1951